The All-Ireland Senior Hurling Championship 1916 was the 30th series of the All-Ireland Senior Hurling Championship, Ireland's premier hurling knock-out competition.  Tipperary won the championship, beating Kilkenny 5-4 to 3-2 in the final.

Format

All-Ireland Championship

Semi-final: (1 match) This was a lone match which saw the winners of the Munster championship play Galway who received a bye to this stage. One team was eliminated at this stage while the winning team advanced to the final.

Final: (1 match) The winners of the lone semi-final played the winners of the Leinster championship.  The winners were declared All-Ireland champions.

Results

Connacht Senior Hurling Championship

Leinster Senior Hurling Championship

Munster Senior Hurling Championship

Ulster Senior Hurling Championship

All-Ireland Senior Hurling Championship

References

Sources

 Corry, Eoghan, The GAA Book of Lists (Hodder Headline Ireland, 2005).
 Donegan, Des, The Complete Handbook of Gaelic Games (DBA Publications Limited, 2005).

1916
All-Ireland Senior Hurling Championship